Kurdistan may refer to:

 Kurdistan, a geo-cultural region consisting of parts of Turkey, Iraq, Iran and Syria
 Iranian Kurdistan, a geocultural region in Iran
 Iraqi Kurdistan, a geocultural region in Iraq, (see Kurdistan Region for the autonomous region)
 Syrian Kurdistan, a geocultural region in Syria
 Turkish Kurdistan, a geocultural region in Turkey
 administrative divisions:
 Kurdistan Province, one of the provinces of Iran
 Kurdistan Uyezd, a former Soviet administrative unit (1923–1929), also known as "Red Kurdistan"
 Kurdistan Eyalet, a former Ottoman administrative unit (1846–1867), one of the eyalets of the Ottoman Empire
 Safavid Kurdistan, a former Safavid administrative unit (1508–1736), one of the ostans of Safavid Iran
 former Kurdish states:
 Kingdom of Kurdistan, a short-lived and unrecognized state (1922–1924) in Iraqi Kurdistan
 Republic of Ararat, an unrecognized republic (1927–1930) in Turkish Kurdistan
 Republic of Mahabad, a short-lived Soviet puppet state (1946) in Iranian Kurdistan
 Kurdistan (newspaper), the first Kurdish-language newspaper

 villages in Khuzestan Province, Iran
 Kordestan-e Bozorg
 Kordestan-e Kuchek
 Shahrak-e Kordestan

See also

 Kurd (disambiguation)